Stephen Glenn Charles Hilton (born 25 August 1969) is a British political commentator and former political adviser. He served as director of strategy for the British Prime Minister David Cameron from 2010 to 2012. Since 2017, Hilton has hosted The Next Revolution, a weekly current affairs show for Fox News.  He is a proponent of what he calls "positive populism" and a vocal supporter of former U.S. President Donald Trump. He was a co-founder of Crowdpac, but stepped down as CEO in 2018 due to conflicting values with the company.

Early life 

Hilton's parents, whose original surname was Hircsák (which some sources spell "Hircksac"), emigrated from Hungary during the Hungarian Revolution of 1956. They came to Britain, initially claiming asylum, and anglicised their name to Hilton. Hilton's father, István, had been goaltender for the Hungarian national ice hockey team and was considered one of the top ice hockey players in Europe in the 1930s. After arriving in Britain, his parents initially worked in catering at Heathrow Airport. They divorced when Steve was five years old leading to what he has described as a struggle and great financial hardship; his mother worked in a shoe store but was primarily dependent on state benefits, and the two lived in a cold, damp basement apartment.

He was given a bursary to Christ's Hospital School in Horsham in Sussex, before studying Philosophy, Politics, and Economics at New College at Oxford University.

Career 
After graduating, Hilton worked at Conservative Central Office, where he came to know David Cameron and Rachel Whetstone, who became his wife and, later, Senior Vice-President of Policy and Communications for Uber. He liaised with the party's advertising firm, Saatchi and Saatchi, and was praised by Maurice Saatchi, who remarked, "No one reminds me as much of me when young as Steve." During this time Hilton bought the "New Labour, New Danger" demon eyes poster campaign for the Conservatives' pre-general election campaign in 1996, which won an award from the advertising industry's Campaign magazine at the beginning of 1997. The Conservatives went on to experience their worst election defeat for more than half a century, with some journalists speculating that the poster contrasted unfavourably with Labour's more positive campaign. In 2005, Hilton lost out to future Secretary of State for Education Michael Gove in the selection process for the Surrey Heath constituency.

Hilton talked of the need to "replace" the traditionally minded grassroots membership of the Conservative Party, which he saw as preventing the party from embracing a more metropolitan attitude on social issues.

It is alleged that Hilton said "I voted Green" after the Labour landslide of 2001, but then worked with Cameron to re-brand the Conservative Party as green and progressive. According to The Economist Hilton "remains appallingly understood". There were reports that Hilton's 'blue sky thinking' caused conflict in Whitehall and, according to Nicholas Watt of The Guardian, Liberal Democrats around deputy prime minister Nick Clegg considered him to be a "refreshing but wacky thinker".

Hilton was satirised in the BBC comedy The Thick of It as the herbal-tea drinking spin doctor Stewart Pearson.

Hilton was director of strategy for the UK prime minister David Cameron from 2010 to 2012. His last memo concerned the advocacy of severe cuts in the number of civil servants in the United Kingdom and further welfare cuts.

Hilton is a co-founder and former CEO of Crowdpac.com, a Silicon Valley technology start-up. In April 2016, Crowdpac launched a beta service in the UK. Hilton resigned from Crowdpac in May 2018. Crowdpac also suspended fundraising for Republican candidates on its platform.

In May 2015, Hilton joined the UK think tank Policy Exchange as a visiting scholar.

His book More Human was published in May 2015. It advocates smaller, human-scale organisations and is critical of large governmental and business, including factory farms and banks. With co-author Giles Gibbons, he wrote Good Business: Your World Needs You, published in 2002.

He spent a year as a visiting fellow at Stanford University's Hoover Institution and Freeman Spogli Institute for International Studies.

Fox News 
In November 2016, writing for Fox News, he announced his support for Donald Trump over Hillary Clinton in the presidential election. Since 2017, Hilton has presented the weekly show The Next Revolution on Fox News.

He was criticised for not rebutting his guest Ann Coulter when she falsely asserted that a recording of migrant children who were separated from their parents by the Trump administration crying were actors.

In March 2019, Hilton claimed that CNN, MSNBC, former CIA Director John Brennan, and former Director of National Intelligence James Clapper as well as Democratic congress members Adam Schiff and Eric Swalwell were the "real agents of Putin" for playing a role in "dividing" the United States over Trump's alleged ties with Russia.

COVID-19 pandemic 
In 2020, during the COVID-19 pandemic in the United States and shortly after social distancing measures and lockdowns were implemented, Hilton called on President Trump to end the measures. Hilton criticized "our ruling class and their TV mouthpieces [for] whipping up fear over this virus". Hilton suggested that "the cure could be worse than the disease"; or more specifically that the long-term public health consequences resulting from the economic damage of a lockdown would be worse than the short-term public health consequences of the virus itself. Trump later appeared to mimic what Hilton said in one of his tweets.

In January 2021, Hilton asserted that the Wuhan Institute of Virology was the most likely source of the COVID-19 virus and falsely claimed that Dr. Anthony Fauci, director of the National Institute of Allergy and Infectious Diseases and chief medical advisor to the president, commissioned the work which led to virus's development. Politifact described Hilton's claims as "rely[ing] on a series of unsubstantiated allegations to spin a conspiracy theory about the virus being a lab creation.".

False 2020 election fraud claims 
After Trump was defeated by Joe Biden in the 2020 presidential election, Hilton promoted Trump's false claims of large-scale fraud on his Fox News show. Trump subsequently tweeted a string of Hilton clips.

Personal life 
Hilton is married to Rachel Whetstone, a former aide (political secretary) to Michael Howard, former head of communications at Google, former senior vice-president of policy and communications of Uber, and current chief communications officer of Netflix. The couple were godparents to David Cameron's son, Ivan, who died at the age of six. He became a U.S. citizen in May 2021.

References

External links 
 
 BBC Radio 4 – Profile, Steve Hilton
 Steve Hilton: 'I’m rich, but I understand the frustrations people have' | Politics | The Guardian
 

1969 births
Living people
Alumni of New College, Oxford
American people of British descent
American people of Hungarian descent
British expatriates in the United States
British political consultants
British political writers
Conservative Party (UK) officials
COVID-19 conspiracy theorists
English people of Hungarian descent
Fox News people
Naturalized citizens of the United States
People educated at Christ's Hospital